Love Life is the fifth studio album by Japanese singer hitomi, released on December 13, 2000, by avex trax.

Description 
Following the 1999 amicable split with her previous producer Tetsuya Komuro, hitomi was able to take more creative control of her album production.  This is evidenced on Love Life by the large collaborative efforts of hitomi with her recording engineers Tetsuya Morimoto, Takeshi Hara, Hiroyuki Shiotsuki, Naoki Yamada, Tohru Oka, and Motohisa Shiraishi.

Love Life was a strong commercially successful album selling over 766,000 copies in Japan and reaching #2 on the Oricon weekly charts.  The singles "Love 2000", "Maria" and "キミにKiss (Kimi ni Kiss)" were all successes within Japan hitting in the top 20 of Oricon singles chart.

The cover of the album showing hitomi undressed with long hair covering her chest caused something of a controversy by its similarity to the Loveppears album of the singer Ayumi Hamasaki, released a year before. This is the album that later gave the name to the production sub label Love Life Record created by hitomi in 2005.

Track listing

References
Official hitomi Site
Official hitomi discography
Oricon archive of Love Life

Hitomi albums
2000 albums
Avex Trax albums
Dance-pop albums by Japanese artists